Tamil Australians refers to Australians with a Tamil background. It includes people who speak Tamil, those whose ancestors were Tamil or those who identify with Tamil culture. Most Tamil Australians are of Indian, Sri Lankan, Singaporean or Malaysian descent.

Demographics

The Census 2016 has found 73161 people speaking Tamil at home. Out of this 28,055 people are born in India and 27,352 people are born in Sri Lanka. Australian born Tamil speakers are counted as 9,979. The total number of ethnic Tamils are around 150,000 people.
This is the first time Indian Tamils have taken over as the majority over the Sri Lankan Tamils in a foreign country other than the United States. There are no exact figures for the number of Tamil Australians but according to the 2011 census there were 50,151 Australians, 0.23% of the population, who spoke Tamil at home. Tamil speaking Australians are of Indian, Sri Lankan, Singaporean and Malaysian ancestry.
The Census 2016 shows an increase of 50% in Tamil population who speak Tamil at home. 
There were 73161 Tamil speakers according to the 2016 Census, with the largest proportion of people across Australia in the suburb of Westmead (1,425 people, or 3.6% of people in that suburb), followed by Toongabbie (NSW) (1,404 people, or 3.5% of people in that suburb).

As per the 2011 census, over 39.59% of Tamil speaking Australians were born in Sri Lanka, 34.89% in India and 13.05% in Australia.

They live concentrated in Wentworthville, Pendle Hill, Girraween, Toongabbie and Strathfield in Sydney and in Glen Waverley and Dandenong North in Melbourne.

More than 80% have completed high school education; the rate is only 50% for the general Australian population. More than 59% own their houses, compared with more than 67% of the general population.

Tamil Australians
 Christie Jayaratnam Eliezer, emeritus professor
 Geraldine Viswanathan, actress
 Nazeem Hussain, comedian
 Clarence Jey, record producer
 Suresh Joachim, multiple Guinness World Record holder
 Kamahl, singer
 Palani O. Thevar, Politician, Social Worker, Labor Candidate for Maiwar 2020 https://www.palanithevar.com.au/
 Kumar Mahadevan, Michelin star chef
 Jega Nadarajah, Olympic Torch Bearer 2000 Olympics
 Duvashen Padayachee, race driver
 Guy Sebastian, singer and winner of the first season of Australian Idol; of partial Malaysian Tamil descent 
 Prashanth Sellathurai, gymnast
 Maha Sinnathamby, entrepreneur
 Renuga Veeran, badminton player
 Jonathan Sriranganathan, Councillor for The Gabba Ward in the Brisbane City Council
 Ecca Vandal, Singer-songwriter
 Vimala Raman, actress
 Dhee, Singer
 Prof Rama Jayaraj, Darwin
 Nivethan Radhakrishnan, Cricketer

References

External links

 Australia Tamil Association
 Australian Tamil Congress
  Australia Tamil Matrimonial Services
 Tamilians Traditional Sarees

Indian Australians
 
Immigration to Australia
Australia